Island Head is at the northern end of a mountainous peninsula on the Central Queensland coast between Yeppoon and St Lawrence. It has two natural harbours, Port Clinton in the south and Island Head Creek in the north.  The western side of the peninsula is Shoalwater Bay, a well known military training area.

Headlands of Queensland